U1, U.I or U-1 may refer to:

Mathematics
U(1), the degree one unitary group

Military
U-1, the USAF and US Military's designation for the De Havilland Canada DHC-3 Otter light transport aircraft
U-1, Soviet designation for Avro 504 trainer.
Multiple German U-boats named U-1
Oberursel U.I, an early German aircraft engine
HDMS U-1, a Danish submarine
SM U-1, an Austro-Hungarian submarine, lead ship of the U-1 class

Entertainment
U1 Technology, a game and software developing company
Ultima I: The First Age of Darkness, a 1981 video game

People
U1, alias for Yuvan Shankar Raja (born 1979), a Tamil musician and film composer
U-1, the main character in the video game Gitaroo Man for the PlayStation 2/PlayStation Portable

Railways
LNER Class U1, a 1924 British solitary 2-8-0+0-8-2 Beyer-Garratt locomotive
SR U1 class, a class of 2-6-0 locomotives developed from the U Class

U-Bahn lines
U1 (Berlin U-Bahn)
U1 (Frankfurt U-Bahn)
U1 (Hamburg U-Bahn)
U1 (Munich U-Bahn)
U1 (Nuremberg U-Bahn)
U1 (Vienna U-Bahn)

Technology
Secure Digital (SD) Cards, class of speed
Apple U1

Other
U1, unemployment figure released by Bureau of Labor Statistics
U1 spliceosomal RNA, a small nuclear RNA component of the spliceosome involved in pre-mRNA splicing.

See also 
 UI (disambiguation)
 1U (disambiguation)

ca:U1